This is a list of foreign referees for the 2017 Liga 1. Since the project started on 5 August 2017 already 13 referees (12 FIFA referees) and 28 assistant referees (22 FIFA assistant referees) who have led the Liga 1 games, each coming from Australia (2 referees and 6 assistant referees), Kyrgyzstan (5 referees and 9 assistant referees), Iran (5 referees and 11 assistant referees) and Japan (1 referee and 2 assistant referees). Until the end of season on 12 November 2017, already 50 matches lead by foreign referees.

Overview
In December 2016, PSSI and the league operator planned to use foreign referees for the 2017 competition. The use of foreign referee was intended to improve the quality of the competition. However, two weeks before the league starts, this plan was cancelled.

After a wide criticism, protest and dissatisfaction towards the local referees during the first round of the season, PSSI revisited the idea. On 18 July 2017, PSSI and the league operator officially announced the use of foreign referees and assistant referees in select matches for the second round. There will be two sets of officials (consisted of 1 referee and 2 assistant referees), each coming from Australia, Kyrgyzstan, Iran and Japan.

List of referees

References

External links
Official website

Liga 1 seasons
2017 Liga 1
2017 in Indonesian football leagues
2017 in Indonesian sport